Dari Azim Khan Halt railway station 
() is  located in  Pakistan.

See also
 List of railway stations in Pakistan
 Pakistan Railways

References

External links

Railway stations in Rahim Yar Khan District